American rock band Papa Roach has released 11 studio albums, one live album, nine extended plays, two compilation albums, 39 singles, and 52 music videos.

The band's first major-label release was the triple-platinum debut album Infest (2000). The group's success continued with their gold album Lovehatetragedy (2002), their platinum album Getting Away with Murder (2004), The Paramour Sessions (2006), Metamorphosis (2009), Time for Annihilation (2010), The Connection (2012), F.E.A.R. (2015), Crooked Teeth (2017) and Who Do You Trust? (2019). Their latest album Ego Trip was released on April 8, 2022.

Albums

Studio albums

Live albums

Compilation albums

Extended plays

Singles

As lead artist

As featured artist

Promotional singles

Other appearances

Videography

Video albums

Music videos

Notes

References

External links
 Official website
 Papa Roach at AllMusic

Discographies of American artists
Rock music group discographies